Ivan Trojan (born 30 June 1964) is a Czech actor, widely considered to be one of the greatest Czech actors of all time. With four Czech Lions for Best Actor in a Leading Role, he has also won two for his supporting roles in Seducer and One Hand Can't Clap, making him the most awarded performer at the Czech Lion Awards. 

He is acclaimed for his performances in films Loners (2000), Želary (2003), Václav (2007), The Karamazovs (2008), In the Shadow (2012) and Angel of the Lord 2 (2016), all gaining success at the box-office and critic circles. He is also known for his award-winning and lauded appearances at the Dejvice Theatre, the Vinohrady Divadlo and the Summer Shakespeare Festival, including Stanley Kowalski in A Streetcar Named Desire, Demetrius in A Midsummer Night's Dream, Eugen Bazarov in Father and Sons and the Father in The Brothers Karamazov.

Career
Trojan was born in Prague. He graduated from the Faculty of Theatre of the Academy of Performing Arts in Prague in 1988 and Realistické divadlo Zdeňka Nejedlého (RDZN) in Prague-Smíchov. He holds a Master of Fine Arts degree from the Academy. In 1992 he moved to Divadlo na Vinohradech (DNV). In 1997 he decided to move to a newly established Dejvické divadlo (DD).
At the International TV Festival in Monte Carlo 2013, Ivan Trojan was awarded the prize of Golden Nymph for the Best Actor in the mini-series Burning Bush.

Personal life
He is son of actor Ladislav Trojan and brother of producer and director Ondřej Trojan. He is married to actress Klára Pollertová-Trojanová with four sons - František (born 1999), Josef (born 2001), Antonín (born 2009) and Václav (born 2012)

Theatre

Dejvice Theatre 

Teremin (2005) .... Léon Theremin, nominated for Alfréd Radok Award
A Streetcar Named Desire (2003) .... Stanley
Sic (2003) .... Theo (by Melissa James Gibson)
Three Sisters (2002) .... Aleksander Ignayevitch Vershinin
Tales of Common Insanity (2001) .... Petr
Oblomov (2000) .... The Title Role - received Thalia Award, nominated for Alfréd Radok Award
The Brothers Karamazov (2000) .... Father Karamazov - Devil
The Incredible and Sad Tale of Innocent Eréndira and her Heartless Grandmother (1999) .... Red Indian
The Government Inspector (1998) .... Anton Antonovitch Skvoznik - Duchanovskij, hetman
Utišující metoda (1997) .... Professor Maillard (by Edgar Allan Poe), nominated for Thalia Award

Vinohrady Theatre 
The Brothers Karamazov (1997) .... Ivan
A Flea in Her Ear (1996) .... Kamil Champsboisy (by Georges Feydeau
Jacobowski and the Colonel (1995) .... Head of Policemen (by Franz Werfel)
Fathers and Sons (1995) .... Eugen Bazarov
Clown (August August August) (1994) .... August jr. (by Pavel Kohout
Le baruffe chiozzotte (1994) .... Commissioner (by Carlo Goldoni)
Romeo and Juliet (1992) .... Romeo
A Midsummer Night's Dream (1990) .... Demetrius, Summer Shakespeare Festival
Merlin oder das wüste Land (1988) .... Parsifal (by Tankred Dorst, RDZN)

Other
Nesles Tower (1996) .... Night of Orgies (by Pierre Henri Cami), Divadlo Viola

Selected filmography 
 2000 – Četnické humoresky (Bedřich Jarý)
 2000 – Loners (Ondřej), nominated for Czech Lion Award
 2002 – The Brats (Marek Sir (father)), received Czech Lion Award
 2002 – Seducer (Karel)
 2003 – Želary (Richard)
 2003 – One Hand Can't Clap (Zdenek), received Czech Lion Award for best actor, also co-writer of the screenplay
 2005 – Wrong Side Up (Petr Hanek)
 2005 – Angel of the Lord (Petronel)
 2007 – Medvídek (Ivan)
 2007 – Václav (Václav Vingl)
 2008 – The Karamazovs (father)
 2012 – In the Shadow
 2012 – Burning Bush (Major Jireš)
 2016 – Angel of the Lord 2 (Petronel)
 2020 – Charlatan (Jan Mikolášek)

Dubbing works 
2016 - Finding Dory - Marlin (Albert Brooks)
2016 - Kung Fu Panda 3 - Master Monkey (Jackie Chan)
2014 - Touch - Martin Bohm (Kiefer Sutherland)
2013 - Luftslottet som sprängdes - Michael Nyqvist (Mikael Blomkvist)
2013 - Flickan som lekte med elden - Michael Nyqvist (Mikael Blomkvist)
2013 - The Girl With The Dragon Tattoo - Michael Nyqvist (Mikael Blomkvist)
2013 - Epic - Mandrake (Christoph Waltz)
2012 - The Killing - Troels Hartmann (Lars Mikkelsen)
2011 - Kung Fu Panda 2 - Master Monkey (Jackie Chan)
2010 - Megamind - Minion (David Cross)
2009 - Monsters Vs. Aliens - Dr. Cockroach (Hugh Laurie)
2008 - Kung Fu Panda - Master Monkey (Jackie Chan)
2008 - Madagascar: Escape 2 Africa - Makunga Alec Baldwin
2006 - Over the Hedge - RJ (Bruce Willis)
2004 - 2013  -24 - Jack Bauer (Kiefer Sutherland)
2003 - Finding Nemo - Marlin (Albert Brooks)
2002 - Look Who's Talking - Mikey (Bruce Willis)
2001 - Look Who's Talking - Mikey (Bruce Willis)
2001 - Ally McBeal - Mark Albert (James Le Gros)
1997 - Friends - Pete Becker (Jon Favreau)
1992 - Back to the Future Part II - Biff Tannen (Thomas F. Wilson) (Cinema Dubbing)
1991 - Back to the Future'' - Biff Tannen (Thomas F. Wilson) (Cinema Dubbing)

External links
 
 Ivan Trojan at CFN.cz

References

1964 births
Living people
Czech male stage actors
Czech male film actors
Male actors from Prague
Academy of Performing Arts in Prague alumni
20th-century Czech male actors
21st-century Czech male actors
Czech male voice actors
Czech Lion Awards winners
Czech male television actors
Recipients of the Thalia Award